The long ciliary nerves are 2-3 nerves that arise from the nasociliary nerve (itself a branch of the ophthalmic branch (CN V1) of the trigeminal nerve (CN V)). They enter the eyeball to provide sensory innervation to parts of the eye, and sympathetic visceral motor innervation to the dilator pupillae muscle.

Anatomy

Origin 
The long ciliary nerves branch from the nasociliary nerve as it crosses the optic nerve (CN II).

Course 
Accompanied by the short ciliary nerves, the long ciliary nerves pierce and enter the posterior part of the sclera near where it is entered by the optic nerve, then run anterior-ward between the sclera and the choroid.

Function 
The long ciliary nerves are distributed to the ciliary body, iris, and cornea.

Sensory 
The long ciliary nerves provide sensory innervation to the eyeball, including the cornea.

Sympathetic 
The long ciliary nerves contain post-ganglionic sympathetic fibers from the superior cervical ganglion for the dilator pupillae muscle. The sympathetic fibers to the dilator pupillae muscle mainly travel in the nasociliary nerve but there are also sympathetic fibers in the short ciliary nerves that pass through the ciliary ganglion without forming synapses.

See also
 Short ciliary nerves

Additional images

References

External links

Ophthalmic nerve